The  were a national sporting event held in Japan 14 times between 1924 and 1943.

References

Sporting events in Japan